Events from the year 1835 in Sweden

Incumbents
 Monarch – Charles XIV John

Events
 - Inauguration of Kjellbergska flickskolan in Gothenburg.
 - The pig iron trade is liberalized. 
 - The Breaking wheel is abolished.
 - Foundation of the Juvenals society.
 - Hesperider by Karl August Nicander.
 - Vännerna by Sophie von Knorring.

Births
 14 January - Emmy Rappe, pioneer nurse    (died 1896) 
 15 February - Clementine Swartz, actress (died 1923) 
 21 March - Maria Magdalena Mathsdotter, Sami  (died 1873) 
 5 June - Amanda Kerfstedt, writer (died 1920)
 30 December - John Börjeson, sculptor
 - Hilda Sjölin, photographer (died 1915)

Deaths
 4 June - Eleonora Charlotta d'Albedyhll, salonnière, cultural patron and poet (born 1770) 
 10 November – Anders Ljungstedt, merchant and historian  (born 1759) 
 23 November – Georg Adlersparre, politician, military and writer  (born 1760) 
 8 May - Sofia Lovisa Gråå, educator  (born 1749) 
 31 July - Adolf Ludvig Stierneld,  baron, politician, courtier and collector of historical documents  (born 1755)
 Christina Fris, industrialist (born 1757)

References

 
Years of the 19th century in Sweden
Sweden